"Gonna Wanna Tonight" is a song recorded by American country music artist Chase Rice.  It was first released to digital retailers as the first promotional single from his third studio album, Ignite the Night, on July 22, 2014 and was released to radio on November 10, 2014 as the album's second official single.  The song was written by Shane McAnally, Jimmy Robbins, and Jon Nite.

Critical reception
Website Taste of Country gave the song a positive review, saying that "[after] the catchy, but very aggressive ‘Ready Set Roll,’ fans will appreciate this softer version of the former football player. He’s not a natural Romeo. Instead, he comes across as a normal guy willing to do anything to make the woman he loves happy. But he’s not totally selfless."

Music video
The music video was directed by Jeff Venable and premiered in January 2015.

Chart performance 
The song has sold 345,000 copies in the US as of November 2015.

Year-end charts

References 

2014 songs
2014 singles
Chase Rice songs
Columbia Nashville Records singles
Songs written by Shane McAnally
Songs written by Jimmy Robbins
Songs written by Jon Nite